James Bidgood may refer to:
James Bidgood (politician) (born 1959), Australian politician
James Bidgood (filmmaker) (1933–2022), American artist